Dumitru Țintea (born 1936) is a Romanian modern pentathlete. He competed at the 1956 Summer Olympics.

References

1936 births
Living people
Romanian male modern pentathletes
Olympic modern pentathletes of Romania
Modern pentathletes at the 1956 Summer Olympics